GodMusic is the second album by Chocolate Genius. It was released on V2 Records on August 7, 2001. The album release party and concert was held at Bowery Ballroom in New York City.

References

2001 albums
Chocolate Genius, Inc. albums
V2 Records albums